Neopostega petila is a moth of the family Opostegidae. It is known only from a lowland rainforest in north-eastern Costa Rica.

The length of the forewings is 2.3–2.6 mm. Adults are mostly white. Adults are probably on wing year round and have been collected in February, April, July and October.

Etymology 
The species name is derived from the Latin petilus (thin, slender) in reference to the unusually slender form of the male valvae, socii, and exogenous cornuti.

References

External links 
A Revision of the New World Plant-Mining Moths of the Family Opostegidae (Lepidoptera: Nepticuloidea)

Opostegidae
Moths described in 2007